Kang Hyo-shil (10 February 1932 – 2 November 1996) was a South Korean film and stage actress.

Biography
Kang was born in Pyongyang in 1932, now the capital of North Korea. Kang's parents were Kang Hong-shik, a noted singer, and actor during the Japanese occupation period of Korea and Jeon Ok, a noted actor known as "Queen of Tears", whose excellent acting as tragic heroines that evoked audiences to tears. Kang had a sister who later became a famous actress of North Korea after their parents divorced and went across to North Korea with her father.

Kang graduated from Pyongyang Jeoil High School. As having watched her mother's acting, and trained by her mother, Kang was strongly influenced by Jeon Ok. In addition, Kang was more active on stage than in film, so she was referred to as a "characteristic actress" during her lifetime. While Kang debuted with a play performed at Pyongyang National Theatre in 1946 when 17 years old, she earnestly started her career as entered Theatre Sinhyeop. During the performances produced by the Performing Arts Research Association (Geugyesul yeonguhoe), Kang met her future husband, Choi Moo-ryong, who later became a popular film actor of the 1960s and 1970s. When at the 21 years old in Korean age, Kang married Choi despite her mother's opposition. The couple debuted as film actors by starring in Kim Ki-young's 1955 film, Box of Death. Kang used a stage name, Jeon Jin-hui for the film.

Kang and Choi Moo-ryong had one son and four daughters including an actor, Choi Min-soo. However, Choi had an affair with Kim Ji-mee, the most popular actress at that time,that the marriage broke off in 1962 after trials for adultery charge and divorce. Choi soon married Kim Ji-mee but also divorced Kim after 6 years of marriage due to his debts.

Kang died of a chronic disease on 2 November 1996 and her body is buried in Cheonan, Gyeonggi province.

Filmography
*Note; the whole list is referenced.

Awards
1970, the 14th Baeksang Arts Awards : TV Best Acting (문기와 수미)
1970, Dong-A Theatre Acting Awards : Best Actress.

References

External links

1932 births
1996 deaths
People from Pyongyang
20th-century South Korean actresses